The Japan Masses Party (Nihon Taishūtō) was a proletarian political party in Japan.

History 
The Japan Masses Party was established in December 1928 by a merger of the Japan Labour-Farmer Party (which had won one seat in the 1928 elections), the Japan Farmers Party, the Proletarian Masses Party and four other working-class parties. With both parties from the right and left having joined the new party, tensions soon arose, resulting in the expulsion of several members of parliament in May 1929.

With a campaign based on tenancy and unemployment issues, the party nominated 23 candidates in the February 1930 elections, winning two seats. In June 1930, it merged with the National Conference for a United Proletarian Party and the National People's Party to form the National Masses Party.

References

1928 establishments in Japan
1930 disestablishments in Japan
Agrarian socialism
Defunct agrarian political parties
Defunct political parties in Japan
Defunct socialist parties in Asia
Political parties disestablished in 1930
Political parties established in 1928
Socialist parties in Japan